Cable Ready is the seventh volume of the Television's Greatest Hits series of compilation albums by TVT Records. The album catalog was later acquired by The Bicycle Music Company. In September 2011, Los Angeles-based Oglio Records announced they were releasing the  Television's Greatest Hits song catalog after entering into an arrangement The Bicycle Music Company. A series of 9 initial "6-packs" including some of the songs from the album has been announced for 2011.

Track listing 
A1 The Simpsons
A2 The Ren & Stimpy Show ("Dog Pound Hop")
A3 The Brothers Grunt
A4 Duckman
A5 The Adventures of Pete & Pete ("Hey Sandy")
A6 Space Ghost Coast to Coast
A7 Clarissa Explains It All
A8 Barney & Friends ("Barney Theme Song"/"Barney is a Dinosaur")
A9 Where in the World Is Carmen Sandiego?
A10 Saved by the Bell
B1 Major Dad
B2 My Two Dads ("You Can Count on Me")
B3 Blossom ("My Opinionation")
B4 Full House ("Everywhere You Look")
B5 Empty Nest ("Life Goes On")
B6 Family Matters ("As Days Go By")
B7 The Cosby Show ("Kiss Me")
B8 A Different World
B9 Roc
B10 The Fresh Prince of Bel-Air
B11 Home Improvement ("Iron John's World")
B12 Roseanne
B13 Seinfeld
B14 Mad About You ("Final Frontier")
B15 It's Garry Shandling's Show ("It's Garry Shandling's Theme")
B16 The John Larroquette Show
B17 Hudson Street
B18 The Single Guy
B19 Davis Rules
B20 Murphy Brown
B21 The Nanny ("The Nanny Named Fran")
B22 Designing Women ("Georgia On My Mind")
B23 Doogie Howser, M.D.
C1 Wings
C2 Anything But Love
C3 Evening Shade
C4 The Days and Nights of Molly Dodd
C5 Sisters
C6 I'll Fly Away
C7 Thirtysomething
C8 My So-Called Life
C9 Beverly Hills, 90210
C10 Melrose Place
C11 The Heights  ("How Do You Talk To An Angel")
C12 21 Jump Street
C13 In the Heat of the Night
C14 Midnight Caller
D1 America's Most Wanted
D2 Unsolved Mysteries
D3 Sledge Hammer!
D4 The Equalizer ("The Equalizer Busy Equalizing")
D5 NYPD Blue
D6 Law & Order
D7 Twin Peaks
D8 Star Trek: The Next Generation
D9 Alien Nation
D10 Lois & Clark: The New Adventures of Superman
D11 Tales From the Crypt
D12 Quantum Leap
D13 Max Headroom
D14 Liquid Television
D15 HBO Feature Presentation
D16 The Tracey Ullman Show ("You're Thinking Right")
D17 The Kids in the Hall ("Having an Average Weekend")
D18 Late Show with David Letterman

References

External links
Television's Greatest Hits at Oglio Records

1996 compilation albums
TVT Records compilation albums
Television's Greatest Hits albums